The Ruth Shonle Cavan Young Scholar Award is an award that has been given annually by the American Society of Criminology in honor of Ruth Shonle Cavan since 1997. It is given to a researcher who has made outstanding contributions to the discipline of criminology, and who has received his or her Ph.D., M.D., or other graduate degree no more than five years before receiving the award.

Past recipients

References

Academic awards
Awards established in 1997
Sociology awards